The Men's 60 kg competition at the 2019 World Judo Championships was held on 25 August 2019.

Results

Finals

Repechage

Pool A

Pool B

Pool C

Pool D

Prize money
The sums listed bring the total prizes awarded to $57,000 for the individual event.

References

External links
 
 Draw

M60
World Judo Championships Men's Extra Lightweight